Grypothrips is a genus of thrips in the family Phlaeothripidae.

Species
 Grypothrips cambagei
 Grypothrips curiosus
 Grypothrips darlingi
 Grypothrips mantis
 Grypothrips okrius
 Grypothrips papyrocarpae

References

Phlaeothripidae
Thrips
Thrips genera